Yannick Mbengono Andoa or simply Yannick Mbengono (born June 11, 1987, Cameroon) is a Cameroon footballer.

Club career

Debrecen
Mbengono won the 2009–10 season of the Hungarian League with Debrecen despite his team lost to Kecskeméti TE in the last round. In 2010 Debrecen beat Zalaegerszegi TE in the Hungarian Cup final in the Puskás Ferenc Stadium by 3–2.

On 1 May 2012 Yannick won the Hungarian Cup with Debrecen by beating MTK Budapest on penalty shoot-out in the 2011–12 season. This was the fifth Hungarian Cup trophy for Debrecen.

On 12 May 2012 Yannick won the Hungarian League title with Debrecen after beating Pécs in the 28th round of the Hungarian League by 4–0 at the Oláh Gábor út Stadium which resulted the sixth Hungarian League title for the Hajdús.

Honours
Debrecen
 Hungarian League (2): 2010, 2012
 Hungarian Cup (2): 2010, 2012

References 

HLSZ 

1987 births
Living people
People from Bertoua
Expatriate footballers in Thailand
Cameroonian footballers
Association football forwards
Budapest Honvéd FC players
Kecskeméti TE players
Debreceni VSC players
Nemzeti Bajnokság I players
Cameroonian expatriate footballers
Expatriate footballers in Hungary
Cameroonian expatriate sportspeople in Hungary